Sim Sang-min (born 3 May 1993) is a South Korean footballer who plays as a defender for Pohang Steelers.

He played at 2013 FIFA U-20 World Cup and joined FC Seoul in 2014.

Career statistics

Club

Honours

Club 
FC Seoul
 Korean FA Cup : 2015

International
South Korea U20
 AFC U-19 Championship: 2012

South Korea U23
 King's Cup: 2015

References

External links 
 
 Sim Sang-min – National Team stats at KFA 
 

1993 births
Living people
Association football fullbacks
South Korean footballers
FC Seoul players
Pohang Steelers players
K League 1 players
Seoul E-Land FC players
K League 2 players
South Korea under-20 international footballers
South Korea under-23 international footballers
Footballers at the 2016 Summer Olympics
Olympic footballers of South Korea
Chung-Ang University alumni